Health Volunteers Overseas (HVO) is a Washington, DC-based nonprofit dedicated to improving the availability and quality of health care in resource-scarce countries. through the training, mentorship, and education of local health professionals.  Since 1986, HVO has relied on establishing equitable partnerships with hospitals, universities, medical institutes, and Ministries of Health to realize its mission. HVO’s programs utilize highly skilled health professionals as short- and long-term volunteers providing both in-person and virtual training, as well as provide scholarships for on-site clinicians to attend international continuing education opportunities. HVO volunteers provide training on average to over 3,100 health professionals each year across 18+ specialties and 23+ countries. Around the world, HVO is transforming lives through education, working towards a world where all people have access to high-quality health care delivered by local health professionals.

History
The idea for the organization was sparked by an article by Dr. Ralph Crawshaw, published in the December 1984 issue of the Journal of the American Medical Association. In the article, Dr. Crawshaw urged fellow medical practitioners to "make a substantial difference to your colleagues in developing countries" and cited the example of Orthopaedics Overseas. In 1986, the Orthopaedics Overseas Board of Directors voted to become the first division of the newly created Health Volunteers Overseas. Two anesthesiologists went to Ethiopia for the first HVO volunteer trip later that year.

Since opening its doors in 1986, HVO volunteers have completed more than 12,000 assignments in Africa, Asia, Latin America, Eastern Europe, the Caribbean. Volunteers are drawn from the fields of anesthesia, dermatology, emergency medicine, hand surgery, hematology, internal medicine, mental health, nursing education, obstetrics & gynecology, oncology, oral health, orthopaedics, pediatrics, pharmacology, rehabilitation (PT, OT, SLP), and wound management.

In 2020, HVO signed the Brocher Declaration, committing to following ethical and sustainable practices for short-term global health engagements.

The issue
The delivery of health care services in any country is dependent on a trained cadre of health care professionals. The well-documented global shortage of health care providers  disproportionately impacts resource-scarce countries. Faced with serious resource constraints, as well as an immense burden of disease, these countries are faced with enormous needs in the health care sector but have limited capacity to educate and support the workforce necessary to meet these needs. As a result, not enough health care professionals are trained, few are offered the opportunity for continued professional education and growth, and most work in isolation with little chance to learn from nearby colleagues. The World Health Organization estimates that the world will be short 15 million health care workers by the year 2030, mainly in resource scarce countries.

HVO's approach
HVO programs focus on building capacity through the delivery of appropriate educational programs that provide local health care professionals with critical  skills, knowledge, and ability. Teaching in the learner’s home environment enables each program to concentrate on health practices and procedures that are both relevant and realistic to that setting. The ultimate goal of HVO programs is to identify and train local health care personnel who can, in time, assume the role of training others. HVO is exporting knowledge and skills instead of medical supplies and equipment. 

As needs and technology have evolved, so has HVO's approach to teaching. In addition to the deployment of short-term  ‘boots on the ground’ volunteers, HVO has implemented several other program delivery channels which, when taken together, represent a more holistic and multifaceted approach to addressing the issues of education and professional development of health care professionals in resource-scarce countries.  These include:  
 Scholarship opportunities for colleagues at project sites who demonstrate exceptional abilities and leadership skills. Offering these future leaders opportunities to learn and participate in regional and international trainings and conferences allows them to share the information with their colleagues at project sites, provides networking opportunities and accelerates their careers.  
 Development and support of longer term placements designed to address critical, specific needs requested by our partner institutions.  The scope of the projects (development of a new department, creation of a quality assurance program)  require a longer time commitment, usually three to six months. These projects are jointly designed by the host institution and HVO and have outlined goals. 
 Non-clinical training such as leadership, management, administration, and basic research skills.  
 Virtual training opportunities. After considering numerous established e-learning platforms, staff determined that they did not meet the criteria of being easily available, affordable, and flexible for use at HVO sites. HVO’s international partners completed surveys to clarify their interest in virtual training, their online capacity, and their availability for training in the midst of the pandemic. Not only was there considerable interest, but the urgency for professional contact and support during these difficult times was particularly acute. With the input of an experienced instructional designer HVO was able to develop our remote education interface (REI) by utilizing Google sites. HVO’s REI is customized to fit our unique program model and is flexible, user friendly, and easily accessible. Partners at each project site can work with HVO staff to customize an REI based on their specific training needs and technological capacities, providing a streamlined and centralized location for trainees and volunteers to engage in training and access resources.

COVID-19 pandemic
The pandemic brought sweeping changes to HVO’s programming, but the mission remained unchanged. Despite shutdowns, and, indeed, because of them, the need to support health care workers in resource-scarce countries only intensified. When countries closed their borders and it became unsafe for volunteers to travel, HVO transitioned temporarily to an entirely online model of virtual trainings, developing the Remote Education Interface (REI), a unique digital platform providing a space for volunteers and learners to connect, share, present, and discuss relevant needs and topics. In addition to transitioning existing partnerships from in-person to online, HVO continued to open more and more online projects, finding that virtual trainings allowed volunteers to reach audiences that they previously been unable to connect with. 

Once travel restrictions lifted and volunteers were once again able to make trips to partner institutions, it became clear that while the return to in-person trips was enthusiastically welcomed, virtual education was here to stay. The hybrid model of programming is an ideal way of delivering the maximum number of educational opportunities to the maximum number of learners. Most HVO projects have moved forward with a mix of virtual and in-person training while several have begun and remained as entirely virtual.

Organizational structure
HVO is governed by a volunteer Board of Directors representing a diverse background of experience and professions. There are more than 195 health care professionals serving in a variety of leadership positions with HVO, providing the framework for managing HVO's extensive portfolio of projects. A staff of eleven is under the management of the Executive Director.

Recognition
HVO is a Platinum Participant in the GuideStar Exchange, highlighting their commitment to transparency, and the organization meets the 20 charity standards of the Better Business Bureau Wise Giving Alliance. HVO has been selected three times for the Catalogue for Philanthropy: Greater Washington (Classes of 2004-2005; 2010-2011; 2017–18).

Sponsors
A unique aspect of HVO's organizational model is the involvement and support provided by leading professional health care associations. These associations, with the year in which they first became a sponsor, are as follows:

 American Academy of Dermatology (2002)
 American Academy of Pediatrics (1993)
 American Association of Colleges of Nursing (1999)
 American Association of Nurse Anesthesiology (1992)
 American Association of Oral and Maxillofacial Surgeons (1987)
 American College of Obstetricians and Gynecologists (2016)
 American College of Physicians (1988)
 American Dental Association (1990)
 American Foundation for Surgery of the Hand (1999)
 American Physical Therapy Association (1995)
 American Society of Clinical Oncology (2007)
 American Society of Hematology (2007)
 British Society for Haematology (2018)

Volunteers
HVO volunteers are trained, licensed health care professionals who are screened by similarly qualified project directors to ensure that their skills and expertise are appropriate to a particular site. Volunteers work alongside their colleagues in resource-scarce countries, providing new insights and techniques. They introduce new teaching methodologies, update or create teaching curricula, and inspire new ways of thinking and problem solving.

Nearly 40% of HVO volunteers are repeat volunteers. Volunteers cover their own travel costs and the average out-of-pocket costs associated with an overseas assignment are $2,900.

Since 2006 HVO recognizes exceptional volunteers annually with the HVO Golden Apple Award. these are individuals who have made extraordinary contributions to the sustainability and effectiveness of Health Volunteers Overseas and to its ability to meet its mission.

Countries served
Health Volunteers Overseas works with local health care professionals in the following countries:
Bhutan
Cambodia
China
Costa Rica
Ghana
Guyana
Haiti
Honduras
India
Laos
Malawi
Mauritania
Myanmar
Nepal
Nicaragua
Peru
Rwanda
St. Lucia
Tanzania
Uganda
Vietnam

References

External links
 Health Volunteers Overseas Website
 HVO Annual Reports and Audited Financial Statements
 Information on global health care crisis, from the Global Health Workforce Alliance
 HVO meets 20 out of 20 charity standards of the Better Business Bureau Wise Giving Alliance
 HVO Board of Directors
 Golden Apple recipients

Health charities in the United States
Charities based in Washington, D.C.
Medical and health organizations based in Washington, D.C.
Medical volunteerism